William Tinninghast Bull (November 10, 1865 – November 8, 1924) was an American college football player and coach, who later became a physician.

Football career
Bull attended William S. Rogers High School in his native Newport, where he played baseball, crew, gymnastics, track and field, and wrestling, as well as football as a fullback and halfback. He then played college football at Yale University from 1886 to 1888, coached by Walter Camp. While at Yale, Bull was part of the secret society called Book and Snake.

Bull served as the first-ever head football coach in Wesleyan University history from 1892 and 1897. He then became the head coach at the Carlisle Indian Industrial School in 1897.

Post-football career
In 1898, Bull entered the Yale School of Medicine, but transferred to the Columbia University College of Physicians and Surgeons two years later. He graduated from Columbia in 1902, receiving the Harsen Prize. Bull practiced medicine in New York City at Roosevelt Hospital, the Society for the Relief of the Ruptured and Crippled, and St. Luke's Hospital. As of 1906, he also practiced in Newport during the summers. He was a member of the American Medical Association.

Personal life
Born to Henry and Sarah Munroe Barstow Russell, Bull is a descendant of Henry Bull, an early colonial Governor of Rhode Island. Bull's uncle of the same name (1849-1909) was also in the medical field as a surgeon and professor of surgery at Columbia University.

Bull married Florence Bush on February 3, 1896, in Brooklyn. The couple had six children: Henry (1901-1902), Cecil, Henry, Marguerite, Aline, and Mary.

A known Republican and Episcopalian, Bull died in 1924 in Asheville.

References

External links

1865 births
1924 deaths
19th-century players of American football
20th-century American physicians
American football fullbacks
Carlisle Indians football coaches
Wesleyan Cardinals football coaches
Yale Bulldogs football coaches
Yale Bulldogs football players
Columbia University Vagelos College of Physicians and Surgeons alumni
Sportspeople from Newport, Rhode Island
Players of American football from Rhode Island
Physicians from New York City
Physicians from Rhode Island
Rhode Island Republicans
Episcopalians from Rhode Island